The Older Stuff: Best of Michael Nesmith (1970-1973) (or more simply The Older Stuff) is a compilation album by Michael Nesmith, released in 1991.

As a follow-up to The Newer Stuff, this release includes tracks from the albums released on RCA records from 1970-1973.

Track listing
All songs written by Michael Nesmith except where otherwise noted.
 "Joanne" – 3:13  
 "The Crippled Lion" – 3:13  
 "I Fall to Pieces" (Harlan Howard, Hank Cochran) – 2:57  
 "Listen to the Band" – 2:34  
 "Silver Moon" – 3:13  
 "Propinquity (I've Just Begun to Care)" – 3:00  
 "I Looked Away" (Eric Clapton, Bobby Whitlock) – 3:15  
 "Nevada Fighter" – 3:08  
 "Tumbling Tumbleweeds" (Bob Nolan) – 3:47  
 "Here I Am" – 3:19  
 "Some of Shelly's Blues" – 3:22  
 "Born to Love You" (Cindy Walker) – 3:52  
 "Different Drum" – 3:02  
 "Harmony Constant" – 3:47  
 "Continuing" – 3:53  
 "Prairie Lullaby  Hill  4:05  
 "Release" – 3:50  
 "Roll With the Flow" – 5:08

References

1991 compilation albums
Michael Nesmith albums
Rhino Records compilation albums